KKAQ 1460 AM is a radio station licensed to Thief River Falls, Minnesota.  The station broadcasts a classic country format and part of the Ingstad Minnesota Radio Network.

References

External links
KKAQ's website

Classic country radio stations in the United States
Radio stations in Minnesota
Thief River Falls, Minnesota